is a Japanese manga series written and illustrated by Kazuki Funatsu. It was serialized in Shueisha's seinen manga magazine Weekly Young Jump from March 2014 to June 2017, with its chapters collected in fourteen tankōbon volumes. In North America, the series is licensed for English release by Seven Seas Entertainment.

Publication
Yokai Girls, written and illustrated by Kazuki Funatsu, was serialized in Shueisha's seinen manga magazine Weekly Young Jump from March 6, 2014 to June 22, 2017. Shueisha collected its chapters in fourteen tankōbon volumes, released from July 18, 2014 to July 17, 2019.

In North America, the series was licensed for English release by Seven Seas Entertainment in April 2017, and started releasing it under its Ghost Ship adult imprint in January 2018.

Volume list

See also
Addicted to Curry, another manga series by the same author
Sundome!! Milky Way, another manga series by the same author
Dogeza: I Tried Asking While Kowtowing, another manga series by the same author

References

External links

Harem anime and manga
Romantic comedy anime and manga
Seinen manga
Seven Seas Entertainment titles
Shueisha manga
Supernatural anime and manga
Yōkai in anime and manga